Salmon Cove is a town in the Canadian province of Newfoundland and Labrador. The town had a population of 764 in the Canada 2021 Census, up from 695 in 2016.

Demographics 

See also
 List of cities and towns in Newfoundland and Labrador

References 

Towns in Newfoundland and Labrador